Todd Belitz (born October 23, 1975) is a former Major League Baseball left-handed pitcher who played for the Oakland Athletics and Colorado Rockies.  

A native of Des Moines, Iowa, Belitz attended Edison High School (Huntington Beach, California) in Huntington Beach, California. He is an alumnus of Washington State University, where he played college baseball for the Cougars from 1995–1997. In 1995, he played collegiate summer baseball with the Brewster Whitecaps of the Cape Cod Baseball League.

Drafted by the Tampa Bay Devil Rays in the 4th round of the 1997 Major League Baseball Draft, Belitz would make his Major League Baseball debut with Oakland on September 4, . His final game came on October 6, .

References

External links

Baseball players from Des Moines, Iowa
1975 births
Living people
Oakland Athletics players
Colorado Rockies players
Major League Baseball pitchers
Washington State Cougars baseball players
Hudson Valley Renegades players
Charleston RiverDogs players
Orlando Rays players
Durham Bulls players
Sacramento River Cats players
Colorado Springs Sky Sox players
Albuquerque Isotopes players
Brewster Whitecaps players
St. Petersburg Devil Rays players
Alaska Goldpanners of Fairbanks players